Sim is the name of several inhabited localities in Russia.

Urban localities
Sim, Chelyabinsk Oblast, a town in Ashinsky District of Chelyabinsk Oblast

Rural localities
Sim, Perm Krai, a settlement in Solikamsky District of Perm Krai